LIPL may refer to:
 Lipoyl amidotransferase
 Octanoyl-(GcvH):protein N-octanoyltransferase